Goth is a 2003 American horror film directed by Brad Sykes.The film starring Phoebe Dollar, Laura Reilly, Dave Stann, Larry Sprock and Todd Livingston in the lead roles.

Cast
 Phoebe Dollar
 Laura Reilly
 Dave Stann
 Larry Sprock
 Larry Sprock
 Todd Livingston
 Jed Rowen 
 Ashley White

References

External links
 
 

2003 films
2003 horror films
2000s horror thriller films
Films set in California
American horror thriller films
American films about revenge
American psychological horror films
2000s psychological horror films
American exploitation films
2000s English-language films
Films directed by Brad Sykes
2000s American films